Uranium mining in New Mexico was a significant industry from the early 1950s until the early 1980s.  Although New Mexico has the second largest identified uranium ore reserves of any state in the United States (after Wyoming), no uranium ore has been mined in New Mexico since 1998.

White Signal district

Grants mineral belt

New Mexico was a significant uranium producer since the discovery of uranium by Navajo sheepherder Paddy Martinez in 1950.  Almost all uranium in New Mexico is found in the Grants mineral belt along the south margin of the San Juan Basin in McKinley and Cibola counties in the northwest part of the state.  Stretching northwest to southeast, the mineral belt contains the Chuska, Gallup, Ambrosia Lake, and Laguna uranium mining districts.  Most of the uranium ore is contained in the Jackpile, Poison Canyon, and Westwater Canyon sandstone members of the Morrison Formation, and in the Todilto limestone, all of Jurassic age.

Several different companies moved into the region in the 1950s, particularly oil companies. They included Anaconda Company, Phillips Petroleum Company, Rio de Oro Uranium Mines, Inc, Kermac Nuclear Fuels Corporation (a cooperative of Kerr-McGee Oil Industries, Anderson Development Corporation, and Pacific Uranium Mines, Inc), Homestake Mining Company, Sabre-Pinion Corporation, United Western Minerals Company (of General Patrick Jay Hurley), J H Whitney and Company, White Weld & Co., San Jacinto Petroleum Corporation, Lisbon Uranium Corporation, and Superior Oil Company.

Current activity
Active uranium mining stopped in New Mexico in 1998, although Rio Algom continued to recover uranium dissolved in water from its flooded underground mine workings at Ambrosia Lake until 2002. Currently (April 7, 2014), there are 12 uranium mines that are either in the process of licensing or actively developing in New Mexico. The state has the second-largest known uranium ore reserves in the US. , these included 201,000 tons of uranium oxide, amounting to 35% of total U.S. reserves, economically recoverable at $50 per lb.

General Atomics' subsidiary Rio Grande Resources is currently evaluating its Mt. Taylor Mine for development by in-situ leaching.  Uranium is present in coffinite in the Westwater Canyon member of the Morrison Formation at 3,000 feet (900 m) below ground surface.  The mine, which operated as an underground uranium mine from 1986 to 1989, has a remaining resource estimated by its owner at more than 45 thousand tonnes of uranium oxide.

Strathmore Minerals Corp. is currently applying for permits to mine their Church Rock and Roca Honda properties in the Grants Mineral Belt.  Neutron Energy and URI also reportedly plan to start uranium mining in the Grants belt.

Health and environmental issues 

New Mexico uranium miners from the 1940s and 1950s have had abnormally high rates of lung cancer, from radon gas in poorly ventilated underground mines.  The effect was particularly pronounced among Navajo miners, because the incidence of lung cancer is normally low among Navajos.  The Navajo tribe, whose reservation contains much of the known ore deposits, declared a moratorium on uranium mining in 2005.

In May 2007, the U.S. Environmental Protection Agency announced that it would join the Navajo Nation EPA in cleaning up radioactive contamination near the Church Rock mine.
In 2017, the US Environmental Protection Agency, the Navajo Nation, and two affiliated subsidiaries of Freeport-McMoRan, Inc., entered into a settlement agreement for the cleanup of 94 abandoned uranium mines on the Navajo Nation. The settlement was valued at over $600 million, with the United States, on behalf of the Department of Interior and Department of Energy, contributing $335 million into a trust account for the cleanup. According to the EPA's announcement of the agreement,  “With this settlement, funds are now committed to begin the cleanup process at over 200 abandoned uranium mines (AUM) on the Navajo Nation.”

Cited references

See also
The Navajo People and Uranium Mining
Anaconda, New Mexico
Mount Taylor (New Mexico)

Geology of New Mexico
New Mexico
Mining in New Mexico